"A Slow Bus to Chingford" is an episode of the BBC sitcom, Only Fools and Horses. It was the fifth episode of series 1, and was first broadcast on 6 October 1981. In the episode, Del acquires an old double decker bus and decides to give tours around London.

Synopsis
As Rodney invites his girlfriend to the flat, Del Boy gives him a job as a nocturnal security officer (NSO) within new security company Trotter Watch (TW). As Rodney is sent to guard a bus depot, Del frightens him by whistling along with him while out of sight.

The next morning at Nelson Mandela House, as Grandad tells Del that he used to be a security officer before the war, Rodney is woken up to hear Del's latest get-rich-quick scheme: Trotters Ethnic Tours. Rodney will drive the bus, Del will be the tour guide, and Grandad will distribute leaflets to the whole of London.

The next day, while the tour bus is ready to go, nobody has turned up at the departure time, but Del bets Grandad £50 that the tourists will show up. Throughout the day, Del tells Rodney and Grandad that he will take the tourists to the house "where Sherlock Holmes was born", and to North London "where Jack the Ripper was buried".

The following day, Del stands on the top floor of the bus and explains to Rodney and Grandad his dream to become a millionaire. He claims to have had a vision in which he sees himself standing on the balcony of a tower block, with the initials of his company in giant flashing lights. As soon as Rodney points out that Trotters Independent Traders spells out "TIT", a dejected Del decides to give up and go home, reluctantly paying Grandad his £50 bet.

As the Trotters get back to Nelson Mandela House, Del finds out the real reason why nobody came: Grandad threw all the leaflets in the rubbish chute. Furious, Del tries to attack Grandad and Rodney starts chasing after his brother, trying to restrain him.

Episode cast

Notes
The actress who played Rodney's girlfriend, Janice, was Nicholas Lyndhurst's girlfriend at the time of filming the series.
The episode title is a pun on the Frank Loesser song (I'd Like to Get You on a) Slow Boat to China

Episode concept
According to John Sullivan, he got the idea for the script from his father's favourite pub called the Duke of Devonshire. The man who ran it was even called Boycie. The place suffered from terrible business, but the owner explained it was "Ethnic English" thus the idea was implanted in Sullivan's mind.

Music
Rock Spectrum: "Layback"

Ronnie Hazlehurst: Original Theme Tune

Note: In the original series 1 broadcasts of Only Fools and Horses, the theme tune was very different to the version adopted from series 2, which became the standard version known today. Composed by Ronnie Hazlehurst, the original theme tune was a jazzy instrumental tune that played over the start and end credits. This tune was replaced in series 2 with a version written and sung by John Sullivan. After the initial run of series 1, all future re-runs replaced the Hazlehurst version with John Sullivan's to match the other series. The VHS/DVD versions all contain John Sullivan's version, and recordings with Hazlehurst's original tune are extremely rare, though it can be heard in a scene during episode 1 of the first series.

References

External links

1981 British television episodes
Only Fools and Horses (series 1) episodes